John Jefferys (1701 – 1754) was an English clockmaker and watchmaker.

His parents, John and Jane Jefferys lived in a house called Darbies in the village of Midgham in the parish of Thatcham in Berkshire. His father was a wool merchant. His maternal grandparents were William and Bridgett Yeats. He had at least five brothers and one sister. Although his father was a Quaker, he was christened on 18 March 1701.

On 4 November 1717 he began an apprenticeship with watchmaker Edward Jagger at Well Close Square, Stepney, London. After nine years of teaching on 26 January 1726 he became a member of the Clockmakers Company of London. In 1735 Larcum Kendall was a new apprentice. Around 1753 he built a pocketwatch for watchmaker John Harrison. After he died Larcum Kendall took over his workshop.

In popular media 
Actor Peter-Hugo Daly was cast as John Jefferys in the Channel 4 TV series, Longitude in 2000.

References

1701 births
1754 deaths
People from Thatcham
18th-century English people
English clockmakers
English watchmakers (people)
Place of death missing